Secretary, Ministry of Finance v Masdar Hossain (1999) 52 DLR (AD) 82 is a case of the Appellate Division of the Supreme Court of Bangladesh. The case concerned the separation of powers in Bangladesh. It is popularly known as the Masdar Hossain case.

Facts
In 1995, a writ petition was filed by Masdar Hossain, a district judge, on behalf of 441 other civil court judges. The petition put forward the following points:-

Including the judicial service under the executive branch's orders was ultra vires. 
Chapter II of Part VI of the constitution ensured lower courts were separate from the executive.
Judges of lower courts could not be subject to an Administrative Tribunal of the executive.

The Dhaka High Court ruled in favor of the petition with a 12-point directive in 1997. The government appealed to the Appellate Division of the Supreme Court.

Judgement
In 1999, the Supreme Court reversed parts of the High Court ruling, but upheld the 12 point directive. It issued a further 12 point directive. The Supreme Court called for the formation of an independent judicial commission to select members of the judiciary, deal with matters of judicial salaries and manage discipline. The Supreme Court ruled that the constitution provided a framework for judicial independence.

Significance
The verdict led to the formation of the Bangladesh Judicial Service Commission. It was implemented by Chief Advisor Fakhruddin Ahmed during the caretaker administration in 2007.

See also
Judicial precedent

References

1999 in case law
Bangladeshi constitutional case law